Adiantum caudatum, commonly walking maidenhair,  tailed maidenhair, trailing maidenhair is a fern in the genus Adiantum and the family Pteridaceae.

Distribution
Adiantum caudatum can be found in shaded areas in south-east countries Bangladesh, Burma, India, Nepal, Philippines, Thailand, China, Vietnam.

References

External links
 

caudatum